The men's field hockey tournament at the 1996 Summer Olympics was the 18th edition of the field hockey event for men at the Summer Olympic Games. It was held over a fourteen-day period beginning on 20 July, and culminating with the medal finals on 2 August. Games were played at the Herndon Stadium and the Panther Stadium, both located in Atlanta, United States.

The Netherlands won the gold medal for the first time after defeating Spain 3–1 in the final. Australia won the bronze medal by defeating Germany 3–2.

Qualification
Each of the continental champions from five federations, the previous Olympic and World champions and the host nation received an automatic berth. Alongside the teams qualifying through the Olympic Qualification Tournament, twelve teams competed in this tournament.

 – Germany qualified both as previous Olympic and continental champion, therefore that quota was added to the ones awarded by the Olympic Qualification Tournament to a total of 5.

Squads

Umpires

Amin Ayman (EGY)
Santiago Deo (ESP)
Henrik Ehlers (DEN)
Steve Horgan (USA)
Floris Idenburg (NED)
Guillaume Langle (FRA)
Craig Madden (GBR)
Antonio Morales (ESP)
Ray O'Connor (IRL)
Yuri Platonov (RUS)
Don Prior (AUS)
Eduardo Ruiz (ARG)
Kiyoshi Sana (JPN)
Roger St. Rose (TRI)
Patrick van Beneden (BEL)
Sasidharan Vasutheven (MAS)
Peter von Reth (NED)
Richard Wolter (GER)

Results
All times are Eastern Daylight Time (UTC−04:00)

Preliminary round

Pool A

Pool B

Classification round

Ninth- to twelfth-place classification

Crossover

Eleventh and twelfth place

Ninth and tenth place

Fifth to eighth place classification

Crossover

Seventh and eighth place

Fifth and sixth place

Medal round

Semi-finals

Bronze-medal match

Gold-medal match

Final rankings

Goalscorers

References

External links

O
Field hockey at the 1996 Summer Olympics
Men's events at the 1996 Summer Olympics